Faouzi Abderrezak Benkhalidi (born 3 February 1963) is an Algerian football forward who played for Algeria in the 1986 FIFA World Cup. He also played for WA Boufarik.

References

External links
FIFA profile

1963 births
Algerian footballers
Algeria international footballers
Association football forwards
1986 African Cup of Nations players
1986 FIFA World Cup players
Living people
Olympique de Médéa players
USM Alger players
WA Boufarik players
21st-century Algerian people